Frederick County Courthouse is a historic county courthouse located at Winchester, Frederick County, Virginia. It was built in 1840, and is a two-story, rectangular, brick building on a stone foundation and partial basement in the Greek Revival style.  It measures 50 feet by 90 feet, and features a pedimented Doric order portico and a gabled roof surmounted by a cupola.  Also on the property is a contributing Confederate monument, dedicated in 1916, consisting of a bronze statue of a soldier on a stone base.

The building currently houses the Shenandoah Valley Civil War Museum.

It was listed on the National Register of Historic Places in 2001. It is located in the Winchester Historic District.

See also
National Register of Historic Places listings in Frederick County, Virginia

References

External links
Shenandoah Valley Civil War Museum, official page 
 

American Civil War museums in Virginia
Courthouses on the National Register of Historic Places in Virginia
Government buildings completed in 1840
Greek Revival architecture in Virginia
County courthouses in Virginia
National Register of Historic Places in Frederick County, Virginia
Museums in Winchester, Virginia
Buildings and structures in Winchester, Virginia